Enchanted Walk (Swedish: Förtrollad vandring) is a 1954 Swedish drama film directed by Arne Mattsson and starring Folke Sundquist, Elsa Prawitz and Edvin Adolphson. The film's sets were designed by the art director Bibi Lindström.

Synopsis
A travelling theatre company arrives in a small town. However the director then flees with the company's funds.

Cast
 Folke Sundquist as Henrik Ulfsax
 Elsa Prawitz as	Louise von Bogenhusen
 Edvin Adolphson as 	Johan Kasimir Enquist
 Hjördis Petterson as 	Mrs. Emilie Hassel
 Erik Hell as 	Strong Man
 Nils Hallberg as 	Mr. Bummel
 Magnus Kesster as 	Magnus von Bogenhusen
 Sonja Stjernquist as 	Lena
 Carl-Gustaf Lindstedt as 	Mefistofeles
 Georg Skarstedt as Thin Man
 John Melin as 	Theatre Manager
 Julia Cæsar as Emma, cook 
 Sven Magnusson as 	Singer
 Lissi Alandh as Waitress
 Ernst Brunman as 	Irate Theatre Visitor
 Ulla-Bella Fridh as Actress 
 Ingemar Holde as 	Stage manager
 John Norrman as 	Circus Manager 
 Stig Johanson as Counterfeiter
 Birger Åsander as Counterfeiter

References

Bibliography 
  Cowie, Peter Françoise Buquet, Risto Pitkänen & Godfried Talboom. Scandinavian Cinema: A Survey of the Films and Film-makers of Denmark, Finland, Iceland, Norway, and Sweden. Tantivy Press, 1992.

External links 
 

1954 films
Swedish drama films
1954 drama films
1950s Swedish-language films
Films directed by Arne Mattsson
Films based on German novels
Swedish black-and-white films
1950s Swedish films